The Miami City Hospital, Building No. 1 is a historic hospital in Miami, Florida. The historic hospital, which is also known as The Alamo is located at 1611 Northwest 12th Avenue. On December 31, 1979, the building was added to the U.S. National Register of Historic Places. It is known today as Jackson Memorial Hospital.

References

External links

 
 
 

Hospitals in Florida
Buildings and structures in Miami
National Register of Historic Places in Miami
Hospital buildings on the National Register of Historic Places in Florida